The Supercopa de la Liga MX was an official Mexican football match that took place on 26 June 2022. The match was the first edition of the Supercopa de la Liga MX, contested by the 2021 Campeón de Campeones and the 2022 Campeón de Campeones. This cup featured Atlas, the 2022 champion, and Cruz Azul, the 2021 champion. The match took place at Dignity Health Sports Park in Carson, California, which hosted the previous five Campeón de Campeones. Like the Campeón de Campeones, this cup was contested at a neutral venue in the United States.

Due to Atlas winning both the Apertura 2021 and Clausura 2022, they were automatically awarded the 2022 Campeón de Campeones title. However, due to
commercial commitments in Liga MX, a match must be played in the United States as the kickoff of the 2022–23 Liga MX season. On 9 June 2022, it was announced Atlas would face defending Campeón de Campeones champions Cruz Azul in a new cup called Supercopa de la Liga MX. This cup will only be played when a club is champion of both the Apertura and Clausura seasons in the same Mexican football year (e.g., Atlas).

Match details

Details

See also
Campeón de Campeones
Supercopa MX

References

Campeón de Campeones
Campeón de Campeones
July 2022 sports events in Mexico